The Trinidad spiny rat (Proechimys trinitatis) is a species of rodent in the family Echimyidae. It is found in Trinidad and Tobago and northern Venezuela.

Phylogeny
Morphological characters and mitochondrial cytochrome b DNA sequences showed that P. trinitatus belongs to the so-called trinitatus group of Proechimys species, and shares closer phylogenetic affinities with the other members of this clade: P. mincae, P. guairae, P. poliopus, P. magdalenae, P. chrysaeolus, P. urichi, and P. hoplomyoides.

References

Mammals of the Caribbean
Mammals of Trinidad and Tobago
Proechimys
Mammals described in 1893
Taxa named by Joel Asaph Allen
Taxonomy articles created by Polbot